MyEnvironment is an application built by the United States Environmental Protection Agency (EPA) to help the public get a sense of environmental indicators in their neighborhood.  By keying in a geography, the application comes back with information about the local land, air, water, climate, and Environmental Justice.  It mines mostly EPA but also other federal Agency databases.  The latest enhancement was a complete update to website including updating the environmental topics and the tools within each topic. The intention is that as people are learning about air and water quality in their neighborhood, they can simultaneously learn about environmental justice and what they can do to help their community.

MyEnvironment receives over one million hits a month and over 100,000 pageviews are downloaded in that same time.  The predecessor tool to MyEnvironment is Window to My Environment.

Environmental Information in MyEnvironment
There are five main topics highlighted within MyEnvironment: MyAir, MyLand, MyClimate, MyWater, and MyEJ (Environmental Justice). Below is a summary of each topic and tools that are highlighted in each.

MyWater
MyWater highlights waterways in your area with an emphasis on why protecting our waterways is important by highlighting a variety of tools and information.
Water quality is a key concern of the EPA. Understanding the complexities of what can be found in your local stream and how that may impact your health or quality of life is an area of extensive research.  MyEnvironment offers the basics of drilling into STORET (one of the EPA's main water monitoring databases) to reveal some of the parameters that may have been sampled for in your local area waters and whether it was found to be present.  After that, you'll need to read about that "indicator" to understand whether it is a cause for concern to your immediate health and how you may protect yourself.
The Clean Water Act is the cornerstone of surface water quality protection in the United States.
Dead Zones also known as Hypoxia disrupt ecosystems and decreases life where it occurs. 
Water Permitting allows users to view information on companies which have been issued permits to discharge waste water into rivers.
Drinking Water Sources are collected from the Safe Water Drinking Information System Federal Reporting System to view information about public water systems and their violations of EPA drinking water regulations.

MyLand
MyLand highlights environmental cleanups in your area by highlighting a variety of tools and information.
Superfund Sites aim to clean up the nation's uncontrolled hazardous waste sites. The EPA is committed to ensuring that remaining National Priorities List hazardous waste sites are cleaned up to protect the environment and the health of all Americans.
Brownfields were once property that were impacted by hazardous waste. The Brownfields program is the cleaning up and reinvesting in these properties protects the environment and takes development pressures off greenspaces and working lands. 
Hazardous Waste can have negative effects on human health. The Resource Conservation and Recovery Act (RCRA) is the public law that creates the framework for the proper management of hazardous and non-hazardous solid waste. Understanding how hazardous waste is managed can help protect human and environmental health.
Food Waste was responsible for 41 million tons of waste in 2017. By eliminating food waste we can help businesses and consumers save money, provide a bridge in our communities for those who do not have enough to eat, and conserve resources for future generations.
Regulated Facilities (Facility Registry System from Envirofacts) EPA collects information from each state about all facilities that either store, handle or emit pollutants to land, air or water.  EPA stores the locational information about these regulated facilities in a database called the Facility Registry System.  MyEnvironment features these facility locations in its central mapper.  As for more in-depth information about which chemicals these facilities are permitted to store/handle/release or other data, MyEnvironment relies on another EPA core database called Envirofacts.  Envirofacts is a system that was developed to support many of the Agency's public access applications that support public inquiry about chemical release, permitting and other facility-specific information beyond the simple location of those facilities.

MyClimate
MyClimate highlights your areas current climate conditions.

Carbon Footprint calculates your carbon footprint. We produce greenhouse gas emissions from burning gasoline when we drive, burning oil or gas for home heating, or using electricity generated from coal, natural gas, and oil. Greenhouse gas emissions vary among individuals depending on a person's location, habits, and personal choices.
Greenhouse Gases are gases that trap heat in the atmosphere are called greenhouse gases. This section provides information on emissions and removals of the main greenhouse gases to and from the atmosphere.
Landfills are the third-largest source of human-related methane emissions in the United States. Reducing methane emissions from MSW landfills is one of the best ways to achieve a near-term beneficial impact in mitigating global climate change. The landfill map highlights landfills in your area using an interactive map that shows the locations of all currently operational LFG energy projects in the United States. 
Anaerobic Digestion is the natural process in which microorganisms break down. MyE using an interactive map to highlight Anaerobic Digesters in your area.

MyAir
Air quality highlights the geographic patterns and problems and MyEnvironment provides a map so that citizens can see what their relative exposure may be especially as they live near major traffic areas, near regulated facilities, or in proximity to confined animal feeding operations.  The Clean Air Act is the law that defines EPA's responsibilities for protecting and improving the national air quality.
Ultraviolet Index(UV index) shows the daily UV index forecasted for your area can help you protect yourself from the sun by bringing a hat, wearing sunscreen or staying indoors.  MyEnvironment provides the results of this popular web service.
Clean Air Act established in 1970 was enacted to control air pollution and emissions. This legislation authorized state and federal governments to hold regulations to limit emissions from industrial and mobile sources. Examples of these pollutants are sulfur dioxide, nitrogen dioxide, carbon monoxide, ozone, and lead. 
The WSIO Tool is a customized watershed analysis application that calculates indices, compares watersheds and produces results in rank-ordered tables, graphs and maps
Regulated Facilities (Facility Registry System from Envirofacts): EPA collects information from each state about all facilities that either store, handle or emit pollutants to land, air or water.  EPA stores the locational information about these regulated facilities in a database called the Facility Registry System.  MyEnvironment features these facility locations in its central mapper.  As for more in-depth information about which chemicals these facilities are permitted to store/handle/release or other data, MyEnvironment relies on another EPA core database called Envirofacts.  Envirofacts is a system that was developed to support many of the Agency's public access applications that support public inquiry about chemical release, permitting and other facility-specific information beyond the simple location of those facilities.

MyEJ
MyEnvironmentalJustice explains what Environmental Justice is and where it is happening in your area through a variety of tools.
EJSCREEN is leveraged through MyEnvironment. EJSCREEN is an environmental justice mapping and screening tool that provides EPA with a nationally consistent dataset and approach for combining environmental and demographic indicators such as National-Scale Air Toxics Assessment (NATA) air toxics cancer risk, NATA respiratory hazard index, percent low income, Traffic Proximity and Volume, etc.
EJ List Serv allows individuals to sign up to receive Environment Justice notifications.
Opportunity Zones are census tracts of low-income and distressed communities designated by state governors and certified by the Department of Treasury. EPA grant programs and other financing, technical assistance, tools, and publications can help communities ensure that new investment brings environmental and public health benefits, in addition to economic revitalization
The Key Acts throughout time are important for understanding the EPA's effort throughout time in fighting for environmental justice.

References

EPA. "MyEnvironment: How to Use This Page."
The Dirt, September 8, 2009. "Government 2.0: EPA's MyEnvironment"

External links
MyEnvironment

Open government in the United States
United States Environmental Protection Agency